Hessa or Hussa is an Arabic feminine given name, which means big, pure, white pearl, also "destiny." The name may refer to:

Hessa Al Jaber (born 1959), Qatari engineer and politician
Hussa bint Ahmed Al Sudairi (1900–1969), Saudi Arabian princess
Hessa bint Salman Al Khalifa (1933–2009), Bahraini queen

References

Arabic feminine given names